Üçtepe (literally “three hills”) is a village in Erdemli district of Mersin Province, Turkey. At  it is situated to the north of Kocahasanlı, a town in Erdemli district. The population of Üçtepe was 1126 as of 2012. Up to 1987 the village was a remote quarter of Kocahasanlı and the population is composed of Yörüks who are nomadic Turkmens just like the residents of Kocahasanlı. The main economic activity of the village is greenhouse agriculture.

References

Villages in Erdemli District